Alim Abubakre is a British-Nigerian senior lecturer in International Business at Sheffield Business School. Prior to working at Coventry University, he was a lecturer at the University of Southampton and Nottingham Management School. He belongs to the Advancing Higher Education Academy as a Senior Fellow (HEA). He graduated from the University of Leicester with a Master of Business Administration.He serves as the non-executive chair of These Executive Minds and is a member of the advisory board for the London Business School Africa Club.

He is a researcher whose work focuses on governance, social issues, and the environment. He was chosen as one of the top 100 Virgin Media up-and-coming entrepreneurs in the UK in 2010. He is also a Certified Management & Business Educator and Fellow of the Institute of Enterprise and Entrepreneurs. He worked with the Poverty Reduction Agency, supported by the World Bank, in Nigeria.

References 

1981 births
Nigerian people
Living people
British Nigerian
Nigerian academics
Nigerian academic stubs